This is a list of events in 2003 that occurred in Europe.

Events

Births

Deaths

References 

 
Years of the 21st century in Europe
2000s in Europe